Townend is a surname. Notable people with the surname include

 Annie Quayle Townend (c.1845–1914), Australian-born New Zealand heiress and philanthropist
 Gertrude Townend, British nurse and suffragette
 John Townend, British politician
 Oliver Townend, British event rider
 Peter Townend (novelist), British novelist, thriller writer, photographer and journalist
 Stuart Townend (headmaster), British athlete, soldier and school headmaster
 Tosh Townend, American skateboarder

See also
 Townend, Cumbria, England
 Townsend (disambiguation)

 Tausend (surname)